Andrey Pavlovich Petrov (September 2, 1930 – February 15, 2006) was a Soviet and Russian composer. He was named a People's Artist of the USSR in 1980. Andrey Petrov is known for his music for numerous classic Soviet films such as Walking the Streets of Moscow, Beware of the Car, and Office Romance.

Life
A native of Saint Petersburg (then Leningrad), Petrov was the son of a military doctor; his mother was an artist. He had little interest in music until, at fourteen, he saw The Great Waltz; after this he decided to become a composer. He studied composition at the Leningrad Conservatory under Orest Yevlakhov.

Petrov is known for his work in various genres; he wrote a number of operas and ballets, as well as symphonic works, incidental and film music, and various songs. He is especially famous for his ballet Creation of the World, based on drawings by Jean Effel. This was performed around the world, with Mikhail Baryshnikov among its first performers. Petrov also scored over eighty films, including the Soviet-American co-production The Blue Bird.

From 1964 until his death Petrov was the head of the Saint Petersburg Composers' Union, to which he was introduced by Dmitri Shostakovich. He also founded and served as the general director of a music festival in Saint Petersburg. He won numerous prizes and awards; on May 22, 1998, he was made an honorary citizen of Saint Petersburg. In 1993 a small planet, asteroid 4785 (Petrov) was named after him.

Petrov's wife, Natalya Yefimovna, was a well-known musicologist; his only daughter, Olga, co-wrote a number of his later works.

Andrey Petrov died in Saint Petersburg; he is buried at the Volkovo Cemetery in the city.

Selected works

Film music (selected) 

Amphibian Man (1961)
Walking the Streets of Moscow (1964)
Thirty Three (1965)
Beware of the Car (1966)
His Name Was Robert (1967)
Fair Wind, "Blue Bird"! (1967)
Zigzag of Success (1968)
Vremya (1970; TV)
Grandads-Robbers (1971)
Taming of the Fire (1972)
The Blue Bird (1976)
White Bim Black Ear (1977)
Office Romance (1977)
Autumn Marathon (1979)
Say a Word for the Poor Hussar (1981)
Station for Two (1982)
A Cruel Romance (1983)
Forgotten Melody for a Flute (1987)

Other works 

 "Poem" for 4 Trumpets, Organ, Strings & Timpani
 Ballet "The Creation of the World" (1968)
 Concerto for Violin & Orchestra (1983)
 Symphony-Fantasy "The Master & Marguerita" (1984)
 Concerto for Piano & Orchestra (1990)

Honours and awards
 Order "For Merit to the Fatherland";
3rd class (2 September 2005) – for outstanding contribution to the development of national musical culture, and many years of creative activity
4th class (29 August 2000) – for his great personal contribution to the development of national musical art
 Order of Lenin (1985)
 State Prize of the Russian Federation (1995)
 Award of the President of the Russian Federation (1999)
Order of the Red Banner of Labour (1967)
 USSR State Prize (1967 and 1976)
 People's Artist of the USSR (1980)
 People's Artist of the RSFSR (1976)
 Honored Art Worker of the RSFSR (1972)
 Honorary citizen of St. Petersburg (Resolution of the Legislative Assembly of St. Petersburg № 104 of 22 May 1998)

References

External links

1930 births
2006 deaths
20th-century Russian male musicians
21st-century Russian male musicians
Musicians from Saint Petersburg
Academicians of the National Academy of Motion Picture Arts and Sciences of Russia
Academicians of the Russian Academy of Cinema Arts and Sciences "Nika"
Communist Party of the Soviet Union members
Honorary Members of the Russian Academy of Arts
Saint Petersburg Conservatory alumni
People's Artists of the RSFSR
People's Artists of the USSR
Recipients of the Nika Award
Recipients of the Order "For Merit to the Fatherland", 3rd class
Recipients of the Order "For Merit to the Fatherland", 4th class
Recipients of the Order of Lenin
Recipients of the Order of the Red Banner of Labour
Recipients of the USSR State Prize
State Prize of the Russian Federation laureates
Male film score composers
Male opera composers
Male operetta composers
Russian ballet composers
Russian film score composers
Russian male classical composers
Russian opera composers
Soviet film score composers
Soviet male classical composers
Soviet opera composers